Klaus Ganter (10 April 1945 – 5 October 1969) was a German cross-country skier. He competed in the men's 15 kilometre event at the 1968 Winter Olympics.

References

1945 births
1969 deaths
German male cross-country skiers
Olympic cross-country skiers of West Germany
Cross-country skiers at the 1968 Winter Olympics
Sportspeople from Freiburg (region)
People from Breisgau-Hochschwarzwald
20th-century German people